A filibuster (from the Spanish filibustero), also known as a freebooter, is someone who engages in an unauthorized military expedition into a foreign country or territory to foster or support a political revolution or secession. The term  is usually applied to United States citizens who incited insurrections across Latin America, particularly in the mid-19th century, usually with the goal of establishing an American-loyal regime that could later be annexed into the United States. Probably the most notable example is the Filibuster War initiated by William Walker in Nicaragua. 

Filibusters are irregular soldiers who act without official authorization from their own government, and are generally motivated by financial gain, political ideology, or the thrill of adventure. Unlike mercenaries, filibusters are independently motivated and work for themselves, whilst a mercenary leader operates on behalf of others. The freewheeling actions of the filibusters of the 1850s led to the name being applied figuratively to the political act of filibustering in the United States Congress.

History

The English term "filibuster" derives from the Spanish , itself deriving originally from the Dutch , 'privateer, pirate, robber' (also the root of English freebooter). The Spanish form entered the English language in the 1850s, as applied to military adventurers from the United States then operating in Central America and the Spanish West Indies.

The Spanish term was first applied to persons raiding Spanish colonies and ships in the West Indies, the most famous of whom was Francis Drake with his 1573 raid on Nombre de Dios. With the end of the era of Caribbean piracy in the early 18th century "filibuster" fell out of general currency.

The term was revived in the mid-19th century to describe the actions of adventurers who tried to take control of various Caribbean, Mexican, and Central-American territories by force of arms. In Sonora, Mexico, there were the French Marquis Charles de Pindray and Count Gaston de Raousset-Boulbon and the Americans Joseph C. Morehead and Henry Alexander Crabb. The three most prominent filibusters of that era were Narciso López and John Quitman in Cuba and William Walker in Baja California, Sonora, Costa Rica and lastly Nicaragua. The term returned to American parlance to refer to López's 1851 Cuban expedition.

Several Americans were involved in freelance military schemes, including Aaron Burr, William Blount (West Florida), Augustus W. Magee (Texas), George Mathews (East Florida), George Rogers Clark (Louisiana and Mississippi), William S. Smith (Venezuela), Ira Allen (Canada), William Walker (Mexico and Nicaragua), William A. Chanler (Cuba and Venezuela) and James Long (Texas). Gregor MacGregor was a Scottish filibuster in Florida, Central, and South America.

Although the American public often enjoyed reading about the thrilling adventures of filibusters, Americans involved in filibustering expeditions were usually in violation of the Neutrality Act of 1794 that made it illegal for a citizen to wage war against another country at peace with the United States. For example, the journalist John L. O'Sullivan, who coined the related phrase "manifest destiny", was put on trial for raising money for López's failed filibustering expedition in Cuba.

The Neutrality Act of 1818 became of great frustration for American filibusters. Article 6 stated anyone engaged in filibustering could receive a maximum three years imprisonment and three thousand dollars in fines. However, it was not uncommon for early Republic politicians to "overlook" and sometimes "assist" some filibuster missions in the hopes to add to U.S. territory. This conflict meant the army were reluctant to arrest filibusters who broke the terms of this legislation. Officers were worried that without permission from the U.S. district court to make these arrests, they could face arrest themselves.

Filibusters and the press
There was widespread support in the press for filibusters' missions. A number of journalists were sympathetic towards filibusters, such as John O'Sullivan and Moses S. Beach at the New York Sun and L. J. Sigur of the New Orleans Daily Delta. All supported Narciso López's Missions to Cuba. John S. Thrasher contributed articles for the annexation of Cuba in New Orleans Picayune. Some journalists also enlisted to fight for filibustering missions, such as Richardson Hardy and John McCann of the Cincinnati Nonpareil. The poet Theodore O'Hara was a member of William Walker's expedition to Nicaragua. He worked on the Kentucky Yeoman and the Democratic Rally newspapers. After this, he served in the Confederate army in the American Civil War.

Antebellum United States

Connection to slavery 
The mid-nineteenth century (1848-1860) saw Southern planters raise private armies for expeditions to Mexico, the Caribbean, Central and South America to acquire territories that could be annexed to the Union as slave states. Despite not being authorized by their government, Southern elites often held considerable sway over U.S. foreign policy and national politics. Despite widespread opposition from Northerners, filibustering thrust slavery into American foreign policy. 

Historians have noted that filibustering was not a common practice and was carried out by "the most radical proslavery expansionists". Hardline defenders of slavery saw its preservation as their "top priority", leading to support for filibusters and their campaigns abroad. Support for filibusters in the U.S. was also driven by a desire to offset British influence in South America. At the height of filibustering, pro-slavery politicians wanted to expand the United States further into Latin America, as far as Paraguay and Peru. However, these attempts were quickly withdrawn when military and diplomatic retaliation was pursued.

Many future Confederate officers and soldiers, such as Chatham Roberdeau Wheat, of the Louisiana Tigers, obtained valuable military experience from filibuster expeditions. The author Horace Bell served as a major with Walker in Nicaragua in 1856. Colonel Parker H. French served as Minister of Hacienda and was appointed as Minister Plenipotentiary to Washington in 1855. However the United States refused to recognized Walker's government as legitimate and President Pierce refused his credentials. Rather than return to Nicaragua, French spent several months spending his spoils enjoying a lavish lifestyle that included staying in luxury hotel suites and entertaining the press and politicians with cigars and champagne. Eventually French ran into legal troubles connected to recruiting volunteers for the Walker regime and he hastily returned to Nicaragua in March 1856.

William Walker 

In the 1850s, American adventurer William Walker launched several filibustering campaigns  leading a private mercenary army. In 1853, he declared a short-lived republic in the Mexican states of Sonora and Baja California. Later, when a path through Lake Nicaragua was being considered as the possible site of a canal through Central America (see Nicaragua canal), he was hired as a mercenary by one of the factions in a civil war in Nicaragua. He declared himself commander of the country's army in 1856; and soon afterward President of the Republic. After attempting to take control of the rest of Central America, while receiving no support from the U.S. government, he was defeated by the four other Central American nations he tried to invade and eventually executed in 1860 by the local Honduran authorities he had tried to overthrow.

In the traditional historiography in both the United States and Latin America, Walker's filibustering represented the high tide of antebellum American imperialism. His brief seizure of Nicaragua in 1855 is typically called a representative expression of manifest destiny with the added factor of trying to expand slavery into Central America.  Historian Michel Gobat, however, presents a strongly revisionist interpretation. He argues that Walker was invited in by Nicaraguan liberals who were trying to force economic modernization and political liberalism, and that thus it was not an attempted projection of American power.

Women's involvement with filibustering
Women often participated in filibustering, taking active roles such as planning, propaganda, participation, and popularization. Women also composed songs, arranged balls and concerts on behalf of the filibusters. Most of the interest came from women in the Gulf and Mid-Atlantic states as they were closer to the events. Correspondingly those in the Northern states tended not to take much interest in what was going on further south. Many women attended the filibuster expeditions as settlers, to help with casualties and to aid the expeditions in any way they could. Many women were at the front line experiencing first hand the armed engagements. A few even took up arms and used them to defend their men and property. Jane McManus Storm Cazneau had an important role in negotiating between filibusters and U.S. politicians. She persuaded Moses S. Beach to promote lectures about William Walker and his group. All of these women embraced the idea of expansionism to spread American slavery in Central and South America. John Quitman's daughter Louisa used anti-Spanish rhetoric as she saw fit in order that the Spanish deserved to be punished for what they had done to Narciso López and his men after they had been taken prisoner.

Filibusters and freemasonry
Several well-known figures in filibusterism were also Freemasons and this organization played a major role within the hierarchy of the filibusters. Narciso López and José Gonzales of the Cuban expedition were both Freemasons. Other Freemasons who took part in filibustering came from Louisiana and were involved with the 1810 incursion into West Florida. Later in 1836 Freemasons were involved in the Texas Revolution. These included Stephen F. Austin, Mirabeau Buonaparte Lamar, and David Crockett among others. Freemasons from New Orleans had helped in planning the conquest of Texas. Several lodges were an important element of the filibusters, contributing many men to the cause of expansionism. Part of the Masonic emphasis was that members should support their country's freedoms. During the period when Narciso López was planning his expedition to Cuba the Havana Club, founded in 1848 by Cuban Freemasons, had endorsed the idea of inviting a filibuster expedition to Cuba in order to overthrow the colonial Spanish and free the island. The flag that López and others designed for their expedition had masonic emblems built into it. These included representations of the Mason's triangular apron. The Star of Texas was included to represent the five points of the fellowship of the Masons. This flag was adopted as the Cuban national flag fifty-two years after López's failed adventure. Other filibustering Freemasons of note included Chatham Roberdeau Wheat and Theodore O'Hara the poet. They came from an extensive network of lodges in the Southern U.S. such as Soloman's Lodge No. 20 in Jacksonville and Marion Lodge No. 19 in Ocala. The reach of the Masons was wide and helpful. On arriving at John Hardee Dilworth's estate, Jose Gonzales used Freemasonry symbols, which prevented him from being arrested as Dilworth was also a Mason and had been told by presidential order to arrest Gonzales.

"Major F. P. Hann" hoax 
The Frank Hann letters were a series of hoax letters published in 1895, purported to be written by a "Major F. P. Hann", who claimed to be an American filibuster fighting against the Spanish colonial rule of Cuba. Hann wrote a fake account of his supposed experiences in the Cuban War of Independence, detailing accounts of battles and operations that took place as well as commenting on the political situation within the country.

The real Frank Hann, a twenty-year-old man who lived in Gainesville, Florida, used the pseudonym "Anderfer" in order to release the letters he forged, acting as a medium for the letters written by "Major Hann". He used the hoax to raise his own profile in the U.S. as a war hero, while also attempting to garner support for filibuster missions in Cuba.

The episode draws attention to the influence of the media and yellow journalism on American sentiment towards foreign affairs during the period.

Depiction in popular media
William Walker's filibusters are the subject of a poem by Ernesto Cardenal. John Neal's 1859 novel True Womanhood includes a character who travels from the US to Nicaragua to aid Walker's campaign. Other media portrayal of filibustering include: Richard Harding Davis novels, The 1987 film Walker by Alex Cox, Joan Didion's A Book of Common Prayer, Ned Buntline's novels The B'hoys of New York and The Mysteries and Miseries of New Orleans and Lucy Petway Holcombe's The Free Flag of Cuba. Season 1 episode 8 of The High Chaparral is titled "The Filibusteros" and depicts a fictional group of post civil war confederate soldiers in Mexico.

See also
 British Legions
 Burr conspiracy
 El Filibusterismo
 Foreign Enlistment Act 1870 (UK)
 Heimosodat
 Hunters' Lodges
 Kingdom of Sedang
 Knights of the Golden Circle
 Little green men (Russo-Ukrainian War)
 Raj of Sarawak
 Vikings

References

Further reading
 Brown, Charles H. Agents of Manifest Destiny: The Lives and Times of the Filibusters. University of North Carolina Press, 1980. .
 Lipski, John M. "Filibustero: origin and development." Journal of Hispanic Philology 6, 1982, pp. 213–238
 May, Robert E. "Manifest Destiny's Filibusters" in Sam W. Haynes and Christopher Morris, eds. Manifest Destiny and Empire: American Antebellum Expansionism. College Station, Texas: Texas A&M University Press, 1997. .
 May, Robert E. Manifest Destiny's Underworld: Filibustering in Antebellum America. University of North Carolina Press, 2002. .
 Roche, James Jeffrey. The story of the Filibusters. T. F. Unwin, 1891.
Schreckengost, Gary. The First Louisiana Special Battalion: Wheat's Tigers in the Civil War. Jefferson, N.C.: McFarland and Company, Inc., Publishers, 2008. .

External links
 Texas A & M Univ. on filibustering
 Latin American studies on the Cuban Filibuster Movement (1849–1856)
 Memory palace podcast episode about filibuster, William Walker. 
 

 
1855 in Nicaragua
19th-century rebellions
Cuba–United States relations
History of United States expansionism
Intelligence operations by type
Mexico–United States relations
Piracy in the Atlantic Ocean